State Route 279 (SR 279) is a primary state highway in the U.S. state of Virginia. Known as Great Neck Road, the state highway runs  from U.S. Route 58 (US 58) north to US 60 within the independent city of Virginia Beach.

Route description

SR 279 begins at an intersection with US 58 (Virginia Beach Boulevard), just north of Interstate 264 in the London Bridge area of Virginia Beach. The roadway continues south as London Bridge Road, along the western edge of Naval Air Station Oceana. The state highway heads north as a four-lane divided highway that crosses Wolfsnare Creek, a tributary of the Lynnhaven River. SR 279 passes between multiple residential subdivisions and meets the northern end of First Colonial Road on the Great Neck peninsula, which lies between the Lynnhaven River to the west and Broad Bay and its tributaries to the east. At the northern end of the peninsula, the state highway crosses over a pair of water links between Broad Bay and the Lynnhaven River and over Bay Island, which is accessed via the highway's old alignment, West Great Neck Road, to the west. SR 279 enters a commercial area and reaches its northern terminus at US 60 (Shore Drive) two blocks south of the Chesapeake Bay shoreline.

Major intersections

References

External links

 Virginia Highways Project: VA 279

279
State Route 279